Edon is a rural locality (a village) in Styopantsevskoye Rural Settlement, Vyaznikovsky District, Vladimir Oblast, Russia. The population was 650 as of 2010. There are 11 streets.

Geography 
Edon is located 42 km southwest of Vyazniki (the district's administrative centre) by road. Kitovo is the nearest rural locality.

References 

Rural localities in Vyaznikovsky District